Francis Komla Ganyaglo (born May 11, 1971) is a Ghanaian politician and the deputy Volta Regional Minister of Ghana.

References

Living people
National Democratic Congress (Ghana) politicians
1971 births